Carex hendersonii, also known as Henderson's sedge or carex de Henderson, is a tussock-forming species of perennial sedge in the family Cyperaceae. It is native to western parts of North America.

Description
The green leaves have basal green sheaths that become lighter near the base. In California it blooms between May and June.

Taxonomy
The species was first described by the botanist Liberty Hyde Bailey in 1887 as a part of the Proceedings of the American Academy of Arts and Sciences. It has one synonym; Carex laxiflora var. plantaginea as described by Olney in 1872.

Distribution
The plant is found in temperate biomes from south western Canada in British Columbia and the range extends down the western parts of the United States through [[Washington (state}|Washington]], Oregon to as far south as California It is just as likely to be found in wetland as non-wetland environments including coastal prairie and oak woodlands.

See also
List of Carex species

References

hendersonii
Taxa named by Liberty Hyde Bailey
Plants described in 1887
Flora of Idaho
Flora of British Columbia
Flora of California
Flora of Oregon
Flora of Washington (state)